McLendon-Chisholm is a city in Rockwall County, Texas, United States. The population was 1,373 at the 2010 census.

Geography

McLendon-Chisholm is located at  (32.846035, –96.390123). It is situated along State Highway 205 in south central Rockwall County, about 6 miles southeast of Rockwall.

History
The community of McLendon-Chisholm began as two separate settlements: McLendon and Chisholm.

McLendon
Named for landowner P.A. McLendon, the community of McLendon was settled around 1870. He built a  combination store, cotton gin, and blacksmith shop that remained in operation until 1975. A post office opened in 1880, and by 1896, McLendon was home to an estimated 150 residents. The post office closed in 1905. Throughout the early 20th century, the population hovered around 50.

Chisholm
The land that  eventually became the site of Chisholm was given to Mexican War veteran King Latham in 1847. Enoch Parson Chisholm and his brother B. Frank Chisholm, from whom the community's name was derived, purchased  from Latham in 1856. A few years later, Enoch purchased an additional  for $2.00/acre. He organized the Chisholm Methodist Church in 1871 and the community of Chisholm was officially platted in 1886. In that same year, Berry Creek Academy was formed through the merger of two local schools. Chisholm's first store opened in 1890 and a post office was established in 1891. By 1898, Berry Creek Academy was the second-largest school in Rockwall County, boasting a total enrollment of 301 students. The Chisholm post office closed in 1905, but the community continued to grow. The population was estimated at 102 in 1904 and peaked around 200 in 1940. By the 1960s, that figure had dropped to around 167.

Incorporation
On October 18, 1969, the two communities incorporated as McLendon-Chisholm. Residents seeking zoning protection and the preservation of their rural lifestyles was the main reason behind the incorporation effort. By the mid-1970s, the city had approximately 170 residents. That number rapidly grew to 480 in the 1980s and 646 by the 1990 census. By 2000, the population had increased to 914, a 41 percent increase over the 1990 figure.

Demographics

As of the 2020 United States census, there were 3,562 people, 1,164 households, and 1,003 families residing in the city.

Education
The City of McLendon-Chisholm is served by the Rockwall Independent School District.

References

External links
 City of McLendon-Chisholm – Official site

Dallas–Fort Worth metroplex
Cities in Texas
Cities in Rockwall County, Texas
Populated places established in 1969